Epsilon Geminorum or ε Geminorum, formally named Mebsuta , is a star in the constellation of Gemini, on the outstretched right 'leg' of the twin Castor. The apparent visual magnitude of +3.06 makes it one of the brighter stars in this constellation.

Nomenclature
ε Geminorum (Latinised to Epsilon Geminorum) is the star's Bayer designation. It bore the traditional names Mebsuta, Melboula or Melucta. Mebsuta has its roots in ancient Arabic where it and the star Mekbuda (Zeta Geminorum) were the paws of a lion. Mebsuta ('Mabsūṭah' مبسوطة) comes from a phrase referring to the outstretched paw. In 2016, the International Astronomical Union organized a Working Group on Star Names (WGSN) to catalog and standardize proper names for stars. The WGSN's first bulletin of July 2016 included a table of the first two batches of names approved by the WGSN; which included Mebsuta for this star.

Properties
The spectrum of this star matches a stellar classification of G8 Ib, where the luminosity class of Ib indicates this is a lower luminosity supergiant star. Alternatively, it may be a star that has passed through the asymptotic giant branch stage and possesses a detached shell of dust. The estimated mass of this star is over 19 times the mass of the Sun, and it has expanded to a radius measured at around 105–175 times that of the Sun. Since 1943, the spectrum of this star has served as one of the stable anchor points by which other stars are classified.

Epsilon Geminorum is radiating around 8,500 times the luminosity of the Sun from its outer atmosphere at an effective temperature of 4,662 K. It is this temperature that gives it the yellow-hued glow of a G-type star. A surface magnetic field with a strength of  has been detected on this star. This topologically complex field is most likely generated by a dynamo formed from the deep convection zone in the star's outer envelope.

Occultations
Epsilon Geminorum lies near the ecliptic, so it can be occulted by the Moon or a planet. Such an occultation took place on April 8, 1976 by Mars, which allowed the oblateness of the planet's outer atmosphere to be measured. Epsilon Geminorum was occulted by Mercury on June 10, 1940, and on September 3, 2015 it was occulted by the asteroid Iphigenia.

In culture
USS Melucta (AK-131) was a United States Navy Crater class cargo ship named after the star.

References

G-type supergiants
Gemini (constellation)
Geminorum, Epsilon
Durchmusterung objects
Geminorum, 27
048329
032246
2473
Mebsuta